(Alfred) Richard Twentyman (1903–1979) was an English architect based in Wolverhampton; chiefly known for modernist buildings around the English midlands.

Life

Twentyman was born in 1903 in Bilbrook, Staffordshire. He was educated at Cambridge University where he studied engineering and then architecture at the Architectural Association in London. In 1933 he joined H. E. Lavender in Wolverhampton and formed Lavender and Twentyman.

He served with the Royal Engineers during World War II.

Twentyman was awarded the RIBA bronze medal in 1953 and received a Civic Trust Award in 1970.

He was an accomplished watercolourist and painter in oils, holding an exhibition of his works at a London gallery in 1978. An oil painting by him, Pigeon Loft, Sedgley, is held by Wolverhampton Art Gallery. The gallery held an exhibition of his paintings and drawings after his death.

Twentyman died on 13 December 1979 aged 76.

Nikolaus Pevsner praised his work at Rubery and Redditch. St Chad's Church, Rubery is described as being a fine Modernist example, and his crematorium at Redditch as a model example for that class of building.

Works

The Mitre, Bradmore 1935
Golden Lion, Cannock Road, Wolverhampton 1935
Oxley Moor Hotel, Wolverhampton 1937
The Pilot, Wolverhampton 1937
The Spring Hill, Penn 1937
The Red Lion, Wednesfield 1938
The Spring Hill, Wolverhampton 1939
The Victoria, Moseley 1939
St Martin's Church, Parkfields, Wolverhampton 1939
St Gabriel's Church, Walsall 1939
All Saints' Church, Darlaston 1952
Bushbury Crematorium, Wolverhampton 1954
GKN Research Laboratories, Birmingham New Road, Wolverhampton 1954
The Good Shepherd Church, Castlecroft, Wolverhampton 1955
Emmanuel Church, Bentley, Walsall 1956
St Nicholas' Church, Radford, Coventry 1957
St Chad's Church, Rubery 1960
St Andrew’s Church, Runcorn 1964
St Andrew's Church, Wolverhampton 1965 - 1967
Redditch Crematorium 1973

References

1903 births
1979 deaths
20th-century English architects
English ecclesiastical architects
People from South Staffordshire District
Architects from Staffordshire
Alumni of the University of Cambridge
Alumni of the Architectural Association School of Architecture
20th-century British painters

Royal Engineers soldiers
British Army personnel of World War II